Takefumi (written: 建文, 健史, 丈史 or 武文) is a masculine Japanese given name. Notable people with the name include:

, Japanese Paralympic athlete
, Japanese composer
 (born 1980), Japanese boxer
 (born 1989), Japanese footballer

Japanese masculine given names